Oegoconia uralskella is a moth of the family Autostichidae. It is found in France, Switzerland, Germany, Austria, Italy, Hungary, Slovakia, the Czech Republic, Bulgaria, Greece, Russia and on Corsica and Sardinia.

The wingspan is about 15 mm.

Subspecies
Oegoconia uralskella uralskella
Oegoconia uralskella corsa Sutter & Liska, 2003 (Corsica, Sardinia)

References

External links
Images representing Oegoconia uralskella at Consortium for the Barcode of Life

Moths described in 1965
Oegoconia
Moths of Europe